The 2019–20 Samford Bulldogs women's basketball team represents the Samford University during the 2019–20 NCAA Division I women's basketball season. The Bulldogs, led by 1st-year head coach Carley Kuhns, play their home games at Pete Hanna Center. They are members of the Southern Conference (SoCon)

Previous season 

The Bulldogs finished the 2018–2019 season 10–20, 5–9 in conference play. They lost in the quarterfinals of the Southern Conference tournament to Furman. They were led by  Mike Morris who would coach his 17th and final season as Samford Women's Basketball coach. Morris announced he was retiring on March 18, 2019.  On April 10, 2019, Carley Kuhns was hired from Valdosta State University to become the third head coach in history.

Roster

Schedule and results

|-
!colspan=12 style=|Exhibition

|-
!colspan=12 style=|Non-conference regular season

|-
!colspan=9 style=| SoCon regular season

|-
!colspan=9 style=| SoCon Tournament

References

Samford
Samford Bulldogs women's basketball